The Réseau Breton 4-6-0 tank locomotives were a class of metre gauge locomotives. The twelve class members were built in two batches by Franco-Belge and Fives-Lille for the Réseau Breton (RB) in France. Introduced in 1904, they were to be found all over the Réseau Breton system, lasting in traffic until the closure of the metre gauge lines in 1967.

Background
The Réseau Breton originally employed a number of 2-6-0T locomotives and also a number of 0-6-6-0T Mallet locomotives. The 4-6-0T locomotives were intended to combine the lightness of the 2-6-0Ts with the power of the Mallets. The locomotives were built to operate on the Loudéac to La Brohinière and Carhaix to Châteaulin lines.

Locomotives

Franco-Belge locomotives
Société Franco-Belge of Raismes built the initial batch of five locomotives. They were numbered E 321–E 325 on the Réseau Breton. The locomotives carried works numbers 1443–1447 respectively.

Fives-Lille locomotives
As the initial design was a success, a further seven locomotives were built by Compagnie de Fives-Lille pour constructions mécaniques et entreprises at Fives (Lille). These locomotives were numbered E 326–E 332 on the Réseau Breton. They carried works numbers 3581–3587 respectively.

History
The locomotives were utilised across the whole of the Réseau Breton system. Some of the locomotives lasted in service on the Réseau Breton until the closure of the metre gauge lines in 1967.

Specifications
They were non-superheated locomotives, with two cylinders of  diameter by  stroke.

Preservation

Two locomotives have been preserved.

E 327
E 327 was saved by Fédération de Amis des Chemins de Fer Secondaires (FACS). In 1979, the locomotive was transferred to the Chemins de Fer de Provence (CP), where it is based at Annot.

E 332
E 332 was initially preserved on the Blonay–Chamby Museum Railway (BC) in Switzerland, where it spent a period on static display. In 2009, it was moved to the Chemin de Fer de la Baie de Somme (CFBS) and has since been restored to working order.

References

Franco-Belge locomotives
Fives-Lille locomotives
4-6-0T locomotives
Railway locomotives introduced in 1904
Steam locomotives of France
Metre gauge steam locomotives